Chardonnay is the commune in the Saône-et-Loire department in the region of Bourgogne-Franche-Comté in eastern France.

The name is a derivative of Cardonnacum, a Latin term to denote the land of Cardus, the owner of the land surrounding this village during the end of the Roman period. The name is also said to mean an area of thistles. Chardonnay and its surrounding Mâconnais region are probably the cradle of  the Chardonnay variety of grape, and the semantic origin of the grape.

In 1994 the vineyard co-operative of Chardonnay amalgamated with that of Lugny.

Sport
The European Lure coursing championships for sighthounds of the FCI were held on 23/24/25 July 2010 in Chardonnay.

See also

Communes of the Saône-et-Loire department

References

Communes of Saône-et-Loire
Saône-et-Loire communes articles needing translation from French Wikipedia